Vallmoll is a municipality in the comarca of Alt Camp, Tarragona, Catalonia, Spain. The village contains around 1250 inhabitants. It is located just off the N-240 road.

References

External links
 Government data pages 

Municipalities in Alt Camp